This is a list of seasons completed by the Nashville Predators of the National Hockey League. This list documents the records and playoff results for all seasons the Predators have completed in the NHL since their inception in 1998.

Table key

Year by year

1 Season was cancelled due to the 2004–05 NHL lockout.
2 As of the 2005–06 NHL season, all games tied after regulation will be decided in a shootout; SOL (Shootout losses) will be recorded as OTL in the standings.
3 The 2012–13 NHL season was shortened due to the 2012–13 NHL lockout.
4 The 2019–20 NHL season was suspended on March 12, 2020 due to the COVID-19 pandemic.
5  Due to the effects of the COVID-19 pandemic, the 2020–21 NHL season was shortened to 56 games.

All-time records

References

National Hockey League team seasons
Nashville Predators
seasons